The Holtwood Arboretum over 5,000 acres (20 km²), also known as Holtwood Preserve, is a recreation area, arboretum, and wildflower preserve located on New Village Road (off Route 372), in Lancaster County, Holtwood, Pennsylvania. It is open to the public daily without charge.

The site is owned by the electric company PP&L, and provides public recreation on Lake Aldred, as well as camping, hiking, picnicking, sightseeing, fishing, and hunting. The lower Susquehanna River runs through the preserve, which also contains substantial fish ladders (said to be the largest in the United States) and a museum of Native American artifacts.

See also 
 List of botanical gardens in the United States

External links 
 Holtwood Preserve

Arboreta in Pennsylvania
Botanical gardens in Pennsylvania
Parks in Lancaster County, Pennsylvania